Child abuse in China is not clearly defined by the Chinese law code. The law of the People's Republic of China on the protection of minors (未成年人保护法) and the criminal law of China (刑法) do not yet have an article on the subject of child abuse. However, the 49th article of the current Chinese constitution forbids the physical abuses of elderly people, women and children. According to Wang Shengjun, former president of the Supreme People's Court of the People's Republic of China, China does not have a specific law enforced to protect the welfare of children. Articles concerning this topic are present but they lack a systematical regulation. There are more than 30 organizations within the Chinese government to which child protection is related, but none of them are specifically established with the purpose of tackling child abuse.

Currently, a large number of child abuse incidents in China have not been legally dealt with. Punishments carried out by law have been light, such as 5 day detentions for the offenders in many cases. The detention is executed according to the public security administration punishments law (治安管理处罚法) which is not related to the protection of children. The 45th article of the aforementioned law detains people who "abuse their family members and are requested be punished by their family members".

According to the Chinese criminal code, an incident of physical abuse can be taken to the court in the form of private prosecution. However, it is extremely difficult for a child to perform such task. In case of obscenity against children, a criminal will receive a sentence of 5 years in prison or more according to the 9th amendment of the Chinese criminal code.

After several violent cases were brought to light, continual backlash from both the general public and netizens have caused the courts in late 2018 to toughen sentences for offenders.

See also
Child abuse in the United States

Sources